The Book Club of Detroit, is a private club and society of bibliophiles in downtown Detroit, Michigan. Founded in 1957, The Book Club of Detroit, is a club for book collectors.

About

The Book Club of Detroit is club whose members are book collectors, book dealers and bibliophiles who meet in the interest not only of sociability, but to share and expand interest in the history of books and bookmaking.

The Club met regularly for many years at the historic Scarab Club in downtown Detroit.

Supporters
The Book Club co-sponsors events with the Detroit Public Library.

FABS
The Book Club of Detroit is a member of the Fellowship of American Bibliophilic Societies (FABS).

Past Speakers

Some notable individuals who have given talks to the club are:

The Remnant Trust

Frederick Gale Ruffner, Jr.

John K. King Books

Past Presidents
1958: Franklin G. Laucomer

1959: Benjamin R. Donaldson

1960: William A. Bostick

1961: C. E. Frazer Clark, Jr.

1962: Donald Weeks (biographer of the artist and writer Baron Corvo, was a founding member.) 

1963 & 1983: James Babcock

1964: Roger Lindland

1965: Alfred H. Whittaker

1966: Seymour Kent

1967: Gloria Francis

1968: Robert Orr

1969: Richard Walker

1970: Evan Thompson

1971: John Neufeld

1972-80: Robert Thomas

1981: Paula Jarvis

1982: Jean Coburn

1984-85: Joann Chalat

1986: Frank Sladen

1987-93: Annie Brewer

1994: James Beall

1995: Alice Nigoghosian

1996: Roy Pilot

1997: Sam Gatteno

1998: Harriet Larson

1999: Barry Neavill

2000: Shahida Nurullah

2001: James Deak

2002 & 2007-08: Joan Knoertzer

2003: Joseph Ajlouny

2004: Jay Platt

2005: Janet Whitson

2006: Marguerite Humes Schwedler

2009-10: C. Hedger Breed

2011-13: Robert K. Jones

2014–present: Frank Castronova

See also

Detroit Athletic Club
Grolier Club
Detroit Club
 Books in the United States

References

External links
 The Book Club of Detroit
 Meetup.com page
 Fabs.org

Book collecting
Book clubs
Organizations based in Detroit
American bibliophiles
Clubs and societies in Michigan
1957 establishments in Michigan